D+ may refer to:

D+ (band), indie rock band based in Anacortes, Washington
Disney+, a subscription streaming service owned by the Walt Disney Company
Digital+, former name of Canal+ (Spanish satellite broadcasting company)
D+, a grade (education)
D+, used to indicate cumulative altitude gain in trail and mountain running sports